HMS Squirrel was designed by Richard Stacey, Master Shipwright of Woolwich. Her design was based on the standardize 20-gun sixth rates. After commissioning she was assigned to Home Waters then the Mediterranean. She took a privateer in 1710. She was dismantled at Deptford with her timbers sent to Woolwich Dockyard for rebuilding as a 374-ton (bm). She was finally broken in 1749.

Squirrel was the fifth ship so named. The name had previously been used for a discovery vessel with Sir Humphrey Gilbert in 1682 and lost in 1583.

Construction
She was ordered on 26 March 1707 from Woolwich Dockyard to be built under the guidance of their Master Shipwright, Richard Stacey. She was launched on 29 December 1707.

Commissioned Service
She was commissioned in 1708 under the command of Commander James Hodsoll, RN for service with Admiral Byng's Fleet in the English Channel and North Sea. During 1710 she came under command of Commander John Gray, RN for service at the Firth of Forth. On 1 June 1710 she took the privateer, La Roue de la Fortune in the North Sea. Commander James Campbell, RN took command in 1711 for service in the English Channel before going to New England. In 1712 back in Home Waters she was on Fisheries patrol, moving to Irish waters in 1714 then on to the Mediterranean. In July 1715 Captain Thomas Smart, RN took command for operations against pirates on the North-East coast.

Rebuild at Deptford 1727
She was docked at Deptford for dismantling in April 1727. Her timbers were then sent to Woolwich Dockyard to facilitate her rebuild. She was ordered to be rebuilt as a 374-ton (builder's measure) 20 gun sixth rate under the guidance of the Woolwich Master Shipwright, John Hayward on 23 March 1727. Her keel was placed on 27 April 1727 with her relaunched on 19 October 1727. Her builder's Measure tonnage was 37622/94 tons. She carried a standardize armament of twenty 6-pounders on the upper deck (UD). She was a full rigged ship. She was completed for sea at a total cost of £4,546.19.10d for building.

Commissioned Service after Rebuild
She was commissioned in January 1728 under Captain Henry Osborn for service in the Mediterranean. She returned to pay off on 27 December 1731.Captain George Anson took command in 1732 for service at South Carolina. She returned and underwent a small repair at Woolwich at a cost of £2,626.11.9d from August thru October 1735. Recommissioning in December  1735 under Captain Peter Warren she proceeded to New England, then took part in Georgia operation where she took a sloop on 28 April 1740. She took part in operations at Cartagena during March and April 1741. She took privateers San Francisco on 1 May 1741 and L'Etoile du Nord on 26 June 1741, She conveyed Mast ships from New England to Home Waters. She was surveyed on 31 December 1741. She underwent a great repair at Deptford at a cost of £6,631.16.2d from February to August 1742. She was recommissioned in June 1742 under Captain Francis Geary followed by Captain Thomas Williams in April 1744 for service in the English Channel. She was under Captain Archibald Stuart for service on the Yarmouth fishery in February 1745. Captain John Douglas took command in April 1746 then Captain James Gambier in December 1747 for cruising.

Disposition
She was surveyed on 5 July 1749. By Admiralty Order (AO) 17 July 1749 she was sold at Woolwich for £260 on 17 October 1749.

Notes

Citations

References
 Winfield 2009, British Warships in the Age of Sail (1603 – 1714), by Rif Winfield, published by Seaforth Publishing, England © 2009, EPUB , Chapter 6, The Sixth Rates, Vessels acquired from 2 May 1660, Flamborough Group, Squirrel
 Winfield 2007, British Warships in the Age of Sail (1714 – 1792), by Rif Winfield, published by Seaforth Publishing, England © 2007, EPUB , Chapter 6, Sixth Rates, Sixth Rates of 20 or 24 guns, Vessels acquired from 1 August 1714, 1719 Establishment Group, Squirrel
 Colledge, Ships of the Royal Navy, by J.J. Colledge, revised and updated by Lt Cdr Ben Warlow and Steve Bush, published by Seaforth Publishing, Barnsley, Great Britain, © 2020, e  (EPUB), Section S (Squirrel)

 

1700s ships
Corvettes of the Royal Navy
Ships built in Portsmouth
Naval ships of the United Kingdom